Tetramoera isogramma is a moth of the family Tortricidae first described by Edward Meyrick in 1908. It is found in Sri Lanka, Malaysia, Hong Kong, Réunion and Africa.

The species' larval host plant is Saccharum officinarum.

References

Moths of Asia
Moths of Africa
Moths described in 1908